The Beginning is the fifth studio album by American rapper Trae. It was released on October 14, 2008, by Rap-A-Lot Records, Asylum Records, and Warner Bros. Records. The album features guest appearances from Dallas Blocker, Jay'Ton, Khujo Goodie, Lil' Boss, Paul Wall, Russell Lee, Slim Thug, and Z-Ro.

Track listing

Charts

References

External links

2008 albums
Trae tha Truth albums
Rap-A-Lot Records albums
Albums produced by Jake One
Albums produced by Mike Dean (record producer)